Mona Ferial Karim is a Lebanese actress.

Filmography

Television
Noktit Hob. 2010
Maitri Nada. 2010
Wajaa El Rouh. 2014
Sarah. 2009

Sources
http://www.annahar.com/article/118479-منى-كريم-لالنهار-أريد-من-زوجي-أن-يطلقني
http://www.amwagenews.com/?p=18856
http://www.elfann.com/news/show/1065463/منى-كريم-تستذكر-هلا-المر-والدتها-فريال-كريم-أسمع-د
http://www.al-akhbar.com/node/115380
http://www.aljaras.com/ليليان-نمري-وابنة-فريال-كريم-الليلة-تت/
http://www.imdb.com/name/nm8282110/
http://www.fanoos.com/society/mona_karim.html
http://www.elcinema.com/person/1007854

External links

Living people
Lebanese television actresses
Lebanese voice actresses
Year of birth missing (living people)